The Pan American Nikkei Association - PANA, the English-language name of the Asociación Panamericana Nikkei- APN, is a multinational, nongovernmental organization. Member countries are Argentina, Bolivia, Brazil, Canada, Chile, Colombia, Japan, Mexico, Paraguay, Peru, Dominican Republic, Uruguay, Venezuela, and the United States.

History

In 1981, Mexican Nikkei organized the first convention. Its character was summarized in a slogan: "Let us be better citizens in our continent" (Seamos mejores ciudadanos en nuestro contiente). Delegates from Argentina, Brazil, Colombia, Peru and the United States joined the Mexican organizers for this initial meeting in Mexico City.

Presidents
Presidents have a term of two years. They could be reelected for one term.
2021 Preside by Mr. Fernando Suenaga
2017-2021 Mr. Fernando Suenaga from Peru (reelected in 2019)
2013-2017 Mr. Arturo Yoshimoto from USA (reelected in 2015)
2009-2013 Mr. Noritaka Yano from Brazil (reelected in 2011)
2005-2009 Mr. Felix Kasamatsu from Paraguay (reelected in 2007)
2001-2005 Mr. Kazunori Kosaka from Argentina (reelected in 2003)
1999-2001 Mr. Carlos Kasuga from Mexico
1995-1999 Mr. Luis Sakoda from Peru
1981-1995 Mr. Carlos Kasuga from Mexico

Biennial conventions
PANA conventions are an opportunity for the nikkei from North and South America to share and discuss issues and events with cultural, historical, political and economic and political consequences that transcend national borders. These gatherings foster idea exchange and create a forum for personal interaction.

The biennial conventions are intended to promotes closer relationships amongst the Nikkei organizations in the Western Hemisphere.  PANA conventions are planned in alternating locations amongst North, Central and South American countries.

The Conventions of the Association of Pan American Nikkei (COPANI) have enlarged across the span of time:
 1981—The 1st convention in Mexico City, Mexico brought together delegates from six countries. Mr. Carlos Kasuga President of the COPANI Committee
 1983—The 2nd convention (COPANI II) was held in Peru.
 1985—The 3rd convention (COPANI III) was in Brazil. Mr. Masahiko Tisaka, President of COPANI.
 1987—The 4th convention (COPANI IV) took place in Argentina.Mr. Malio Sakata President of the COPANI Committee
 1989—The 5th assembly (COPANI V) was held in the United States at Los Angeles. Mr. Noritoshi Kanai President of the COPANI Committee
 1991—The 6th convention (COPANI VI) was hosted by Paraguay's Nikkei.
 1993—The 7th gathering (COPANI VII) in Vancouver, Canada brought together 400 delegates from 11 countries.Mr. Mark Ando President of the COPANI Committee
 1995—The 8th assembly (COPANI VIII) in Lima, Peru.
 1997—The 9th convention (COPANI IX) took place in Mexico.Mr. Carlos Kasuga President of the COPANI Committee
 1999—The 10th convention (COPANI X) was held in Chile.
 2001—The 11th convention (COPANI XI) was hosted by the United States Nikkei at New York City. Mr. Francis Sogi President of the COPANI Committee
 2003—The 12th convention (COPANI XII) was hosted by the Bolivian membership.
 2005—The 13th convention (COPANI XIII) in Vancouver, Canada was actively supported by the National Association of Japanese Canadians.Mr. Arthur Miki President of the COPANI Committee.
 2007—The 14th Convencion Panamericana Nikkei (COPANI XIV) in São Paulo, Brazil was organized in part by Zaidan Hojin Kaigai Nikkeijin Kyokai.  Approximately 700 attended. Mr. Noritaka Yano President of the COPANI Committee.
 2009—The 15th Convention(COPANI XV) was held in the city of Montevideo, Uruguay. Mr. Emilio Ohno President of the COPANI Committee
2011 - The 16th Copani (COPANI XVI) was held in Cancun, Mexico under the leadership of young Nikkeis from Mexico. Mr. Hiro Kashiwagui President of the COPANI Committee
2013 - The 17th Copani (COPANI XVII) was held in Buenos Aires, Argentina on September 12–14, 2013. Approximately 500 Attended. Supported by the Centro Nikkei Argentino and a youth staff of approximately 80 young Argentinian Nikkeis. Mr. Sebastian Kakazu President of the COPANI Committee
2015 - The 18th Copani (COPANI XVIII) was held in Dominican Republic on August 6–8, 2015.  Sponsored by FUNDONI ( Fundacion Dominicana Nikkei - Foundation of the Dominican Nikkei) See www.copani.org  Ms. Eiko Kokubun President of the COPANI Committee.
2017 - The 19th Copani (COPANI XIX) was held in Lima - Peru in 2017 Theme" Building our Future" (Spanish "Contruyendo Nuestro Futuro").Mr. Juan Carlos Nakasone President of the COPANI Committee.
2019 - The 20th Copani (COPANI XX) was held in the USA - San Francisco, California on September 20–22, 2019.  "The Future is Here." About 250 participated. Mr. Roger (Roji) Oyama President of the COPANI Committee.
2021 - The 21st Copani (COPANI XXI) will be held in Asuncion - Paraguay. Postponed to 2023 due to COVID-19 pandemic in Paraguay.
2023-The 21st Copani (COPANI XXI) will be held September 2023(Tentative) in Asuncion-Paraguay with a theme OÑONDIVEPA (in Guarani, in English "All together, all United", in Spanish "todos juntos, todos unidos").
2025 - The 22nd Copani (COPANI XXII) will be held in Vancouver - Canada to be confirmed.

Important dates 
International Nikkei Day (Dia Internacional del Nikkei) on June 20 of each year starting from 2018.  Decided by The Association of Nikkei & Japanese Abroad and Association Pan-American Nikkei in Honolulu Hawaii.

References

Sources
 Kasamatsu, Emi. (2005).  Historia de la Asociación Panamericana Nikkei: Presencia e inmigración japonesas en las Américas.  Asunción: Servilibro. ; OCLC 68741080
 Kikumura-Yano, Akemi and Daniel K. Inouye. (2002).  Encyclopedia of Japanese Descendants in the Americas: An Illustrated History of the Nikkei.. Walnut Creek, California: Rowman Altamira.  ; OCLC 48965106
 Masterson, Daniel M. and Sayaka Funada-Classen. (2003).  The Japanese in Latin America.  Urbana: University of Illinois Press.

External links
  Asociación Panamericana Nikkei web page
 Asociación Peruano Japonesa website

Japanese diaspora in North America
Overseas Japanese organisations
Community building